Busan Asiad Stadium or Asiad Main Stadium is a multi-purpose stadium in Busan, South Korea, that was built for the 2002 Asian Games and was also used for matches at the 2002 FIFA World Cup. It has a capacity of 53,769. The stadium hosted the opening and closing ceremonies of the 2002 Asian Games and was also the venue of athletics events during the games.

2002 FIFA World Cup
The stadium was one of the venues of the 2002 FIFA World Cup, and held the following matches:

External links
 Busan Sports Facilities Management Center 
 Busan Sports Facilities Management Center 
 World Stadiums

 

Sports venues in Busan
2002 FIFA World Cup stadiums in South Korea
Football venues in South Korea
Athletics (track and field) venues in South Korea
Busan IPark
Venues of the 2002 Asian Games
Stadiums of the Asian Games
Asian Games athletics venues
Asian Games football venues
Sports venues completed in 2001
K League 1 stadiums
K League 2 stadiums
2001 establishments in South Korea